WDR 3 is a German public radio station owned and operated by the Westdeutscher Rundfunk (WDR).

References

Radio stations in Germany
Radio stations established in 1964
1964 establishments in West Germany
Mass media in Cologne
Westdeutscher Rundfunk